The 1960 Maine gubernatorial special election was a special election held to officially elect a Governor of Maine following the death of Governor Clinton Clauson.  It took place on November 8, 1960, with Republican Governor John Reed (who, as Maine Senate President, automatically took office upon Clauson's death) defeating Democrat Frank M. Coffin.

The election was also the first time since Maine was admitted to the Union that the state did not hold its election in September.  Traditionally, Maine had held its elections two months before the rest of the nation, which had help give birth to the phrase "As Maine goes, so goes the nation" and its status as a bellwether state. However, following a 1957 referendum, the state constitution was amended to hold all elections after 1958 in November and shift from two-year to four-year terms.

Results

Notes

1960
Maine
Gubernatorial
November 1960 events in the United States
Maine 1960